Porcelain is Fuel's third EP. The self-released compact disc sold over 5,000 copies. It was recorded, mixed and produced by Randy Lane and Carl Bell.

Content 
Released in 1996, this EP contains songs that were recorded for their debut studio album, Sunburn. Only two songs, “Nothing” and “Sunday Girl”, did not make it to the final album, however, “Sunday Girl” was played live throughout the Sunburn tour and released on the “Shimmer” single.

Track listing 
 "Ozone Baby (Sucker)" - 3:49
 "Song For You" - 3:40
 "Shimmer" - 3:13
 "Nothing" - 3:20
 "Sunday Girl" - 3:20
 "Mary Pretends" - 3:25
 "Hideaway" - 4:16

Personnel 

 Brett Scallions – lead vocals, rhythm guitar
 Carl Bell – lead guitar, backing vocals
 Jeff Abercrombie – bass
 Erik Avakian – keyboards, backing vocals
 Jody Abbott – drums

Porcelain EP
Fuel (band) albums